Faultline 49 is an alternate history novel by Joe MacKinnon (as David Danson) that re-imagines Canada, marred by American military checkpoints, re-contextualized 9/11 attacks, rubble, and riots. The story follows an American reporter through US-occupied Canada, and depicts his metamorphosis from a petulant talking head into a hunted revolutionary. It was published in 2012.

Plot
The book centers around a Seattle reporter's (David Danson) gonzo-style trip through US-occupied Canada in search of the principal provocateur in the Canadian-American War: terrorist mastermind Bruce Kalnychuk. As Danson draws closer to the truth about the 2001 World Trade Center bombing in Edmonton, Alberta, and the criminal war it propagated, his journalistic distance to the story collapses, rendering him not only a brutalized participant, but a target of the US government.

Behind the facade of Canadian pulp fiction lies an engagement with the issues of imperial overstretch, occupation, and economic/cultural sovereignty on the fringe of the American Empire. Faultline 49 has been noted to be a "250-page thought exercise [that] swaps Edmonton with New York City, and also Canada with Iraq, Afghanistan and other nations in a buildup of violence, fabrication and barely concealed geopolitical oil interests."

David Danson is a fictional personality. The actual author is Joe MacKinnon. David Danson was used to advance the simulacra.

Publication
Danson, David (2012). Faultline 49, Guy Faux Books. 978-0-9881640-2-4.

Footnotes

External links
Faultline 49 Official Website
Review, The Edmonton Journal
Book Club: Faultline 49 by David Danson
Alternate history catches fire
Faultline 49 presents a post-9/11 world not quite as we remember it
A Canadian version of 9/11

2012 Canadian novels
Canadian alternative history novels
Dystopian novels
Novels set in Canada
Canada–United States relations in popular culture